Mirka Rantanen (born ) is a Finnish musician. He was the drummer for power metal band Thunderstone when it formed in 2000. Rantanen has also drummed for a number of other Finnish bands, including as a session member for the supergroup Northern Kings. He currently plays drums in the band King Company.
Rantanen started a heavy metal band for children called "Hevisaurus" in 2010.  His character is an Apatosaurus called "Komppi Momppi".

References

External links
 Mirka Rantanen at Encyclopaedia Metallum

Living people
Date of birth missing (living people)
Finnish heavy metal drummers
Warmen members
Thunderstone (band) members
Year of birth missing (living people)
1970s births